Dergalt is a townland in County Tyrone, Northern Ireland. It is situated in the historic barony of Strabane Lower and the civil parish of Camus and covers an area of 488 acres. US President Woodrow Wilson's ancestral home is located in the townland.

The name derives from the Irish: dearg alt (red glenside).

The population of the townland declined during the 19th century:

See also
List of townlands of County Tyrone

References

Townlands of County Tyrone
Barony of Strabane Lower